West Rockhampton is a suburb of Rockhampton in the Rockhampton Region, Queensland, Australia.

Geography 

The suburb is bounded to the west by Lion Creek.

The centre and west of the suburb is occupied by the Rockhampton Airport. The eastern part is residential.

Murray Lagoon is in the southern corner of the suburb.

History 
Crescent Lagoon State School opened on 8 July 1896. It moved to its current location in 1932.

In 1905, a Baptist Church opened in West Rockhampton. A stump-capping ceremony took place on Saturday 15 April 1905. The official opening was held over two days, Sunday 11 June 1905 and Sunday 18 June 1905.

Heritage listings 
West Rockhampton has the following heritage listings:
 Canoona Road: St Aubins (house)

Education 
Crescent Lagoon State School is a government primary (Prep-6) school for boys and girls at North Street Extended. In 2018, the school had an enrolment of 389 students with 29 teachers (28 full-time equivalent) and 17 non-teaching staff (12 full-time equivalent). It includes a special education program.

Facilities 
West Rockhampton is also the location of the Rockhampton Airport, the Rockhampton Golf Club and the Brothers Rockhampton Roos the local Australian Rules Football Club.

The Rockhampton Regional Council operate a public library at the Rockhampton Airport called the "Anytime Library" (which, as at 2018, is open from 5am to 9:30pm every day).

Big Bulls 
West Rockhampton is home to one of the seven Big Bulls statues that decorate Rockhampton, which regards itself as the Beef Capital of Australia. There is a statue of a Droughtmaster bull outside Rockhampton Airport. The Big Bulls are listed as one of Australia's big things.

The theft of the testicles from the bulls is a common prank and they frequently have to be replaced. Some residents also feel that the bull statues over-emphasise one aspect of the city and should be relocated to less prominent locations. However, there is strong public support for the retention of the bulls.

References

External links

 

 
Suburbs of Rockhampton